Kurasov is a Russian masculine surname, its feminine counterpart is Kurasova. It may refer to
Aleksandr Kurasov (born 1992) Russian acrobatic gymnast
Vladimir Kurasov (1897–1973), Soviet military leader
Vladislav Kurasov (born 1995), Ukrainian singer-songwriter

Russian-language surnames